Three Years Jotna is a political advocacy group in the Gambia, which advocates for the resignation of president Adama Barrow.

Background 
The group's name drives from the Wolof word Jotna, meaning "year", to imply "Three Years Are Up". The group consists of eight local executive members and two outspoken members based in the diaspora. The movement has been demanding Barrow's resignation from power in accordance with his campaign promise during the 2016 Gambian presidential election, known as the 3 year coalition agreement. The group is headed by a Gambian-based in American with pseudo name King Sport who is regarded as the architect of the movement alongside a UK Gambian-based name Sheriff Ceesay.

History 
Prior to 2016 Gambian presidential election, a group of opposition parties reluctantly came together with a common goal of uprooting the 22 years of dictatorial regime of Yaya Jammeh. After the formation of the coalition, a primary was conducted at Kairaba Beach Hotel, and Adama Barrow a Real-Estate Developer and a former executive member of the biggest opposition party United Democratic Party (U.D.P) won the inter-party primary and he became the coalition flag bearer. However, one key clause in the coalition agreement penned by all the presidential aspirants is that whoever win the election will be president for only 3 years; during which he will lead the transitional government and ensure all the necessary reforms such as security reform, media, electoral, a new constitution etc. and including overseeing the elections in which he would not contest.

President Barrow, who had since renegade the coalition agreement and has now aligned himself to the former dictatorial regime of Yaya Jammeh. Currently, six top minister who worked under Jammeh albeit most of them are alleged to be involved in human rights violation, corruption, and abuse of office. Among them is Ousman Sowe, the current director of the infamous state's National Intelligence Agency (NIA). Also the current finance Minister Mam Burr Njie was implicated in Janneh Commission  for his alleged involvement in costing the state millions of dollars during his time as finance minister under Jammeh.

Many political analysts argued that, President Barrow's unfaithful character, misappropriations of states funds, Jammeh-like status quo and the expected but untimely sacking of Ousainou Darboe the Leader of the biggest opposition party in the Gambia U.D.P was the boiling point for dissatisfaction among many Gambians. They argued that 3 Year Jotna became even stronger after the public statement by the U.D.P party secretary general for his party's support for the coalition 3 year agenda. To the contrary, Ousainou Darboe's previous stand on the issue prior to his sacking from the administration was that president Barrow should serve the 5 year constitutional mandate. As a matter of fact he once said during an interview that “I will take anyone to court who forcefully ask for president Barrow’s resignation”  banking on the constitutionality of the presidency. His argument may sound valid since the constitution of the Gambia said “ a president shall serve 5 year term in office” but ethically, it is questionable.

According to Voice Newspaper in November, 2019 Ousainou Darboe said “UDP urged all the parties to the 2016 Coalition agreement, particularly its principal beneficiary, President Adama Barrow to be faithful to the terms and conditions of the Gambian electorates that if elected he will serve for a term of three years only and step down to supervise free, fair and transparent presidential elections.” Many Gambians believed that the coalition failed the electorates, because their biggest error or legal argument is that the Gambian constitution states that " The term of office of an elected President shall, subject to subsection (3) and (6), be for a term of five years; and the person elected President shall before assuming office take the prescribed oaths." Although the constitution also stipulate that the president can resign voluntarily if he/she deems it necessary.

But President Barrow after tasting the sweetness of power, gradually morphed and distance himself from the 3 years agreement. Even though the leader and secretary general of the U.D.P and former Vice President Lawyer Ousainou Darboe famously said that he will go to court  if anyone forced president Barrow to quit after 3 years. Many Gambians criticized the former VP for his comments then and now following his shift on the 3 years debate. The former VP now publicly support the Three Years Jotna movement and said during a press conference that that was his individual stand as a professional Lawyer, but now the U.D.P as a party support the 3 years agreement and the president should quit and we go back to polls. It is important to note all these shift in rhetoric follows after the fall out of the two former colleagues. President Barrow sacked the Mr Darboe following rumors and apparent conflict of interest and  Barrow's greed for leadership. The later want to maintain power and was clandestinely forming groups and divisions within the U.D.P his former party and the former publicly said he won't allow any person to kill U.D.P. in any way form or shape.

Upon firing Darboe alongside two prominent ministers  from U.D.P. many political analyst described the firing as a “political suicide.” Well, that is debatable but what is visible is that Barrow's popularity has sink and is still dropping down significantly. Many Gambians accused Barrow of betrayal and power hungry as he abandon the reform agenda and implant back former dictator Jammeh's crime ring from security and bureaucrats back to his administration. Barrow who reinstate officers who publicly confess of atrocities at the Truth Reconciliation, and Reparation Commission (TRRC) back into office outraged many Gambians especially the victims of Jammeh's reign. All these ill practices and corruptions contributed both to the formation of the 3 Years Jotna movement group.

Protests and Counter-Protest 

Following media war and competition for crowd size, the 3 years jotna conduct their first peaceful protest in December, 2019 at the outskirt of the capital, Banjul near Denton Bridge to handover their petition to the president. The police assigning of that region was regarded by many as a calculated move to dissuade supporters of the movement from attending the protest. But this plan backfired, over 30,000 Gambians attended the protest and it was covered by local and international media such as Al-Jazeera. The government was shocked and surprised by the turnout and as a result, a pro-Barrow group called Gambia for 5 years did a counter protest to change the narratives. After two months, the 3 year jotna seek for a police permit to stage another protest, but their application was denied, date changed, and negotiations were brokered between them and the government through civic society organizations and religious leaders which resulted to the police issuance of permit. But this time a different location and 3 hours’ time limit. On the day of the protest, a heavy militarized paramilitary where stationed at the site and the protest turn violent well before it even get started. And then police fired tear gas and stones were allegedly coming from both sides which resulted to many injuries. Though no fatality was reported despite initial reports of 3 deaths.

Banning 3 Years Jotna and Shutting 2 Radios Stations Down 
The government spokesman Bai Sankareh, hurriedly released an unfitting statement banning the movement, and shutting down two independent radio stations King FM and Home Digital Radio for covering the protest. The information minister Ebrima Sillah, a former U.D.P member turns Barrow ally said he was not aware of the closure of the radio stations at the time. Subsequently, they arrest the leadership of the movement including the chairman Abdou Njie who was arrested while visiting the victims at a local hospital in Kanifing. Other arrestees include Lawyer Yankuba Darboe a prominent UK-based Gambian Lawyer, Haji Sawaneh, Kitim Jarju, Sherrifo Sonko, Fanta Mballow, and Karim Touray. The government charged them on various crimes that are being litigated at the high court in Banjul. They are all currently remand at the notorious mile two central prison in Banjul while going on trial.

Court Trial and Bail 

The movements' executives were remanded for weeks without bail despite multiple attempts by their defense lawyers. However, they are now being granted bail after the government dropped two out the five alleged charges.

References

External links 

 https://allafrica.com/stories/202001301055.html
 https://www.chronicle.gm/ousainou-darboe-lamin-dibba-and-amadou-sanneh-fired/
 https://www.amnesty.org/en/latest/news/2020/01/gambia-mass-arrests-risk-fuelling-tensions/
 https://www.dw.com/en/gambian-president-rolls-back-press-freedom/a-52213639
 https://standard.gm/rights-group-launches-formal-complaint-against-govt-over-handling-of-3yj/
 https://www.voicegambia.com/2019/11/07/udp-urges-president-barrow-to-honour-coalition-agreement/
 http://hrlibrary.umn.edu/research/gambia-constitution.pdf
 https://fatunetwork.net/the-implications-of-udps-u-turn/

Political activism
Political advocacy groups in Africa
Organizations established in 2016
Gambian activists